David or Dave Young may refer to:

Entertainment
 David Young (Canadian playwright) (born 1946), Canadian playwright and novelist
 David Young (novelist) (born 1958), British novelist
 David Young (judge), daytime court television show judge in Miami
 Judge David Young, daytime court television show
 David Young (TV producer), British game show producer
 David Young (Neighbours), fictional character on Australian soap opera Neighbours
 David Young, founding editor of the Farmers' Almanac, 1818
 David Young, writer and actor for CollegeHumor web site

Music
 David Young (saxophonist, 1912-1992), American jazz tenor saxophonist
 Dave Young (bassist) (born 1940), Canadian jazz double bassist
 David Young (guitarist) (1949–2022), English musician, record producer and sound engineer
 Dave Young (musician) (born 1982), Canadian rock musician
 David Young (musician) (active from 1990), American recorder musician
 David Young (composer), American video game music composer

Politics
 David Young (Labour politician) (1930–2003), British Labour Party MP, 1974–1997
 David Young, Baron Young of Graffham (1932–2022), British politician and Cabinet minister from the 1980s
 David Young (Ontario politician) (born 1957), Canadian politician in Ontario
 David Young (Watergate) (born 1936), member of a covert ops team under U.S. President Richard Nixon
 David Young (Iowa politician) (born 1968), former member of the U.S. House of Representatives
 David Young (North Carolina politician) (born 1959), businessman and Chairman of the North Carolina Democratic Party
 Dave Young (Colorado politician), member of the Colorado House of Representatives
 David Young III (1905–1977), American politician in New Jersey
 David Young (Louisiana politician), state senator (African-American officeholders during and following the Reconstruction era)
 David Young (diplomat), American diplomat

Sports

Football and rugby
 David Young (footballer, born 1945), English footballer for Newcastle, Sunderland, Charlton, and Southend in the 1970s
 David Young (Australian footballer) (born 1954), Australian rules footballer for South Melbourne and Collingwood
 Dave Young (American football) (born 1959), tight end selected in the 1981 NFL Draft
 David Young (footballer, born 1965), English footballer for Darlington in the 1980s
 David Young (gridiron football) (born 1979), defensive back selected in the 2003 NFL Draft
 Dai Young (born 1967),  Welsh rugby union and Rugby league international and British Lion
 Dave Young (rugby union) (born 1985), Irish rugby union player
 Dave Young (footballer), former Wigan Athletic player

Other sports
 David Turquand-Young (1904–1984), British modern pentathlete
 David Young (swimmer) (1907–1988), American Olympic swimmer
 David Young (wrestler) (born 1972), American professional wrestler
 David Young (cricketer) (born 1977),  English cricketer
 David Young (basketball) (born 1981), drafted by the Seattle SuperSonics
 David Young (hurler) (born 1985), Irish sportsperson
 David Young (rower), English rower
 David Young (discus thrower), Scottish athlete

Other
 David Young (bishop) (1931–2008), British Anglican bishop; Bishop of Ripon
 David Young (cleric) (1844–1913), Wesleyan minister and historian
 David G. Young III, U.S. Air Force general
 David Young (British Army officer) (1926–2000), General Officer Commanding Scotland
 David Allan Young (1915–1991), American entomologist
 David M. Young Jr. (1923–2008), American mathematician
 David Young (bomber), former policeman who took hostages at an elementary school in Cokeville, Wyoming, 1986